The 2021 Cork Junior A Hurling Championship was the 124th staging of the Cork Junior A Hurling Championship since its establishment by the Cork County Board in 1895. The championship began on 6 November 2021 and ended on 20 November 2021.

The final was played on 20 November 2021 at Páirc Uí Rinn in Cork, between Ballygiblin and Dromtarriffe, in what was their first ever meeting in a final. Ballygiblin won the match by 2-18 to 0-18 to claim their first championship title.

Séamus Harnedy was the championship's top scorer with 1-18.

Qualification

Duhallow Junior A Hurling Championship 
Group A

Dromtarriffe 1-23 - 2-11 Kanturk

Banteer 0-15 - 0-16 Millstreet

Dromtarriffe 0-17 - 1-11 Banteer

Kanturk 0-11 - 2-24 Millstreet

Group B

Newmarket 0-19 - 2-11 Kilbrin

Castlemagner 2-09 - 0-22 Newmarket 

Kilbrin 2-24 - 0-15 Castlemagner 

Knockout Stage

North Cork Junior A Hurling Championship 
Group A

Dromina 4-19 - 1-09 Shanballymore

Kilshannig 4-14 - 2-13 LC Gaels

LC Gaels 2-15 - 0-13 Shanballymore

Dromina 1-18 - 3-12 Kilshannig

Kilshannig 1-14 - 0-16 Shanballymore

LC Gaels 1-11 - 2-17 Dromina

Group B

Fermoy 3-21 - 3-09 Araglen

Ballygiblin 2-14 - 1-13 Killavullen

Ballygiblin 0-16 - 2-10 Fermoy

Killavullen 1-19 - 1-11 Araglen

Killavullen 1-17 - 0-09 Fermoy

Araglen 0-09 - 3-21 Ballygiblin

Group C

Buttevant 2-16 - 0-14 Ballyclough

Clyda Rovers 1-17 - 1-17 Ballyhooly

Clyda Rovers 0-23 - 1-11 Buttevant

Ballyhooly 4-31 - 1-11 Ballyclough

Ballyhooly 3-23 - 1-11 Buttevant

Ballyclough 0-10 - 4-25 Clyda Rovers

Group D

Charleville 1-17 - 0-20 Harbour Rovers

Harbour Rovers 1-22 - 0-09 Castletownroche

Castletownroche 2-16 - 1-23 Charleville

Knockout Stage

Results

Bracket

Quarter-finals

Semi-finals

Final

Championship statistics

Top scorers

Top scorers overall

In a single game

References

External links 

 Cork GAA website

Cork Junior Hurling Championship
2021 in Irish sport
Cork Junior Hurling Championship